The Jewish Parachutists of Mandate Palestine were a group of 250 Jewish men and women from  Mandate Palestine who volunteered for operations run by British organisations MI9 and the Special Operations Executive (SOE) which involved parachuting into German-occupied Europe between 1943 and 1945. Their mission was to organize resistance to the Germans, aid in the rescue of Allied personnel and carry out assignments set by the  Jewish Agency of Palestine.

History
Of the 250 original volunteers, 110 underwent training. Thirty-two eventually parachuted into Europe and five infiltrated the target countries by other routes. Most of those selected for training were emigrés from Europe, with intimate knowledge of the countries to which they would be sent. Three of the parachutists infiltrated Hungary, five participated in the Slovak National Uprising in October 1944, and six operated in northern Italy. Ten parachutists served with British liaison missions to the Yugoslav partisans. Nine parachutists operated in Romania. Two others entered Bulgaria, and one each operated in France and Austria.

The Germans captured twelve and executed seven of the 37 parachutists sent into occupied Europe. Three of those executed were captured in Slovakia. Two were captured in Hungary and one in northern Italy. After seven missions the parachutist who entered France was captured and killed.

Hannah Szenes, one of the best-known of the MI9 parachutists, was seized in German-occupied Hungary and executed in Budapest on 7 November 1944, at the age of 23. Szenes was a talented poet and her songs are still sung in Israel.

After the war, remains of three of the seven parachutists killed in the war, including Szenes, were interred on the National Military and Police cemetery in Mount Herzl cemetery in Jerusalem. Memorials for the other four are also at Mount Herzl Cemetery.

Mount Herzl burials
A national burial site is located in the national military and police cemetery at Mount Herzl in Jerusalem:

Sergeant Haviva Reik, Woman's Auxiliary Air Force H.Q. and MI9. Died 20 November 1944, age 30. AKA Ada Robinson and Martha Marinovic.
Sergeant Stephan Rafael Reisz, Royal Air Force Volunteer Reserve 159 G.H.Q. (Middle East) and SOE. Died 20 November 1944, age 30. AKA S. Rice.
Aircraftwoman 2nd Class Hannah Szenes, Woman Auxiliary Air Force and MI9. Died 7 November 1944, age 23.

Gallery

See also
 Sara Braverman
 Reuven Dafni
 Enzo Sereni
 Dan Laner

References

External links
Jewish Parachutists of Mandate Palestine in the Commonwealth War Graves Commission site
Combat and Resistance: Jewish Soldiers in the Allied Armies on the Yad Vashem website
United States Holocaust Memorial Museum - Jewish Parachutists from Palestine

 
Jewish resistance during the Holocaust
Military units and formations of the British Army in World War II
Jews in Mandatory Palestine
Burials at Mount Herzl
Military units and formations of Mandatory Palestine in World War II
Military units and formations established in 1943
Military units and formations disestablished in 1945